Alexander Vysokinsky (Russian: Александр Геннадьевич Высокинский; born 24 September 1973) is a Russian politician serving as a senator from the Legislative Assembly of Sverdlovsk Oblast since 8 October 2021.

Alexander Vysokinsky is in the list of personal sanctions introduced by the European Union, the United Kingdom, the USA, Canada, Switzerland, Australia, Ukraine, New Zealand, for ratifying the decisions of the "Treaty of Friendship, Cooperation and Mutual Assistance between the Russian Federation and the Donetsk People's Republic and between the Russian Federation and the Luhansk People's Republic" and providing political and economic support for Russia's annexation of Ukrainian territories.

Biography

Alexander Vysokinsky was born 24 September 1973 in Sverdlovsk. In 1996, he graduated from the Ural Institute of Management. Since December 2000, he was the head of the Department of Competitive Advantages and Investment Attractiveness of the Committee for Economics of the Administration of Yekaterinburg. From May 2002 to June 2008, he was the Chairman of the Economic Committee of the Administration of Yekaterinburg. In 2008  Vysokinsky was appointed the deputy head of Yekaterinburg. From 2016 to 2018, he was the deputy Governor of Sverdlovsk Oblast. On 25 September 2018, he was elected mayor of Yekaterinburg. On 8 October 2021, he became the senator from the Legislative Assembly of Sverdlovsk Oblast.

References

Living people
1973 births
United Russia politicians
21st-century Russian politicians
People from Irkutsk Oblast
Members of the Federation Council of Russia (after 2000)